Darai (also Romanized as Dārā’ī) is a village in Koregah-e Sharqi Rural District, in the Central District of Khorramabad County, Lorestan Province, Iran. At the 2080 census, its population was 2,726, in 552 families.

References 

Towns and villages in Khorramabad County